Climo is a surname. Notable people with the surname include:

Andrew Climo (born 1961), Cornish author and community activist
Brett Climo (born 1964), Australian actor
Frazier Climo (born 1987), New Zealand rugby union player
Ken Climo (born 1969), American disc golfer
Liz Climo (born 1981), American cartoonist, animator, children's book author, and illustrator
Skipton Climo (1868−1937), British officer of the Indian Army